Wangsa Maju LRT station is an elevated rapid transit station in Wangsa Maju, Kuala Lumpur, Malaysia, forming part of the Kelana Jaya Line (formerly known as PUTRA). The station was opened on June 1, 1999, as part of the line's second segment encompassing 12 stations between Kelana Jaya station and Terminal PUTRA  and an underground line.

Location 
Wangsa Maju station is the third last station northwards to Gombak.

The station is situated directly within the northern Kuala Lumpur suburb of Wangsa Maju. The station, located along the main thoroughfare of Jalan 1/27A (Malay; English: 1/27A Road) running from the northwest to the southeast, is wedged between two residential estates: Section 1 of Wangsa Maju to the southwest and Desa Setapak (Setapak Countryside) to the northwest, with Section 2 of Wangsa Maju located further northwest. In addition to accessibility from Jalan 1/27A, the station is also connected via Jalan 16/27B (16/27B Road), Desa Setapak's residential road.

Due to its proximity to various shopping centres, Alpha Angle and Aeon Big, and two higher education institutions - which are TARC and UTAR - in the region, the station is usually busy during the weekdays.

Bus Services 
Kumpool Vanpool ride-sharing service to Wangsa Maju LRT Station also available here.

Feeder buses

Other buses

Incident

Robbery
On June 3, 2007, two men wearing full face motorcycle helmets and wielding parangs robbed the Wangsa Maju station at 10:10 pm (MST) and relieved RM7,000 from its ticket counter. No injuries were reported. The robbery, having taken place at a mass transit station, is the first of its kind in the country.

See also

 List of rail transit stations in Klang Valley

References

External links
Wangsa Maju LRT Station - mrt.com.my

Kelana Jaya Line
Railway stations opened in 1999
1999 establishments in Malaysia
20th-century architecture in Malaysia